Robin Faber (born 2 July 1986) is a Dutch former professional footballer who played as a central defender.

Career
Born in Doetinchem, Faber played youth football with De Graafschap and PSV. He spent the 2007–08 season with Vitesse, but failed to make a first-team appearance. He then played for ADO Den Haag, but was released by the club in December 2008, alongside Virgilio Texeira, Tim De Meersman and Samir El Moussaoui, after failing to make a first-team appearance for them. He signed for FC Eindhoven following a successful trial in August 2009, scoring 1 goal in 19 appearances for the club. He signed for Icelandic club Víkingur in July 2010, making 6 appearances for them. Upon his return to the Netherlands, he played in the lower leagues with Quick Boys, Westlandia and DZC '68.

References

1986 births
Living people
Dutch footballers
De Graafschap players
PSV Eindhoven players
SBV Vitesse players
ADO Den Haag players
FC Eindhoven players
Knattspyrnufélagið Víkingur players
Quick Boys players
RKVV Westlandia players
DZC '68 players
Eerste Divisie players
Úrvalsdeild karla (football) players
Association football defenders
Dutch expatriate footballers
Dutch expatriate sportspeople in Iceland
Expatriate footballers in Iceland
People from Doetinchem
Footballers from Gelderland